Elymnias cumaea is a butterfly in the family Nymphalidae. It was described by Cajetan Felder and Rudolf Felder in 1867. It is endemic to Sulawesi in the Australasian realm.

Subspecies
E. c. cumaea (North Sulawesi: Minahassa)
E. c. toliana  Fruhstorfer, 1899 (North Sulawesi: Toli Toli)
E. c. bornemanni Ribbe, 1889 (Banggai Island)
E. c. phrikonis Fruhstorfer, 1899 (Sula Mangoli)
E. c. relicina Fruhstorfer, 1907 (Sula Besi)
E. c. resplendens Martin, 1929 (Sulawesi)

References

External links
"Elymnias Hübner, 1818" at Markku Savela's Lepidoptera and Some Other Life Forms

Elymnias
Butterflies described in 1867
Butterflies of Indonesia
Taxa named by Baron Cajetan von Felder
Taxa named by Rudolf Felder